Liberty Hill is an unincorporated community in Cleburne County, Alabama, United States.

References

Unincorporated communities in Cleburne County, Alabama
Unincorporated communities in Alabama